The Shire of Mundubbera was a local government area in the northern catchment of the Burnett River, Queensland, Australia.

The Shire's economy was based on citrus production, grain crops, beef cattle, pigs and dairying.

History
The Shire of Auburn came into being on 19 May 1915, being created from part of the Shire of Eidsvold and part of the Shire of Rawbelle. However, the name was not a popular choice, eventually resulting in it being renamed Shire of Mundubbera on 5 January 1923. In 1932, it lost some of its area to the neighbouring shires of Eidsvold and Monto.

On 15 March 2008, under the Local Government (Reform Implementation) Act 2007 passed by the Parliament of Queensland on 10 August 2007, the Shire of Mundubbera merged with the Shires of Biggenden, Eidsvold, Gayndah, Monto and Perry to form the North Burnett Region.

Towns and localities
The Shire of Mundubbera included the following settlements:

 Mundubbera
 Boynewood
 Dykehead
 Gurgeena
 Monogorilby
 Mundowran
 Philpott
 Riverleigh

Population

Chairmen and mayors
 1927: J. J. Mardy 
 2000–2004: Doug McIvor
 2004–2008: Bruce Serisier

References

Mundubbera Shire
1915 establishments in Australia
2008 disestablishments in Australia
Populated places disestablished in 2008